In software development, downstream  refers to a direction away from the original authors or maintainers of software that is distributed as source code, and is a qualification of a patch. For example, a patch sent downstream is offered to the developers or maintainers of a forked software project. If accepted, the developers or maintainers will include the patch in their software fork, either immediately or in a future release. 

For contrast, see Upstream (software development), code sent toward the original development team.

See also 

 Upstream (software development)
 Backporting
 Waterfall software development
 Fork (software development)

References 

Computing terminology
Software project management